Eadie was an English automobile manufactured from 1898 until 1901.  A product of Redditch, it was built as either a motor tricycle or quadricycle, and featured a 2¼ De Dion engine.

See also
 List of car manufacturers of the United Kingdom

References
 David Burgess Wise, The New Illustrated Encyclopedia of Automobiles.

Defunct motor vehicle manufacturers of England
Companies based in Redditch